The Xiaomi Mi A3 is the third smartphone in the series of Mi A- smartphones developed by Xiaomi and co-developed by Google as part of its Android One initiative.

Specifications

Hardware 
The phone features a 6.088 inch HD+ (1560 x 720 pixel) resolution, 283ppi Super AMOLED display, a glass and plastic body, with Corning Gorilla Glass 5 protection on its front as well as its back. It is powered by a Qualcomm Snapdragon 665 SoC. It also has a 2.0, Type-C 1.0 reversible connector.

It has an AI assisted triple rear camera setup. The main camera has a 48MP Sony IMX586 sensor; there are also the 8MP ultrawide and 2MP depth sensing cameras. The front camera has a resolution of 32MP. The battery has a capacity of 4030mAh, which supports 18W quick charging via Qualcomm Quick Charge 3.0.

Software 

The Xiaomi Mi A3 is part of the Android One program, where software updates are provided directly from Google.

The phone comes with Android 9 "Pie" preinstalled. An Android 10 update was released on 29 February but rolled back due to bugs. It was re-released again on 18 March. On 31 December 2020 Xiaomi released Android 11 update, but it bricked every device it was installed on. Xiaomi fixed the issue within a week, but so far they have not told the reason for the failed update.

Release 
The Xiaomi Mi A3 is a re-branded Xiaomi Mi CC9e smartphone, that comes with Android One instead of MIUI on the Mi CC9e. The Xiaomi Mi CC9e is a version meant for China, while the Xiaomi Mi A3 is the global version of the Mi CC9e. The Xiaomi Mi CC9e was first released in July 2019, only a couple of weeks before the Mi A3.

References 

Android (operating system) devices
Xiaomi smartphones
Mobile phones introduced in 2019
Mobile phones with multiple rear cameras
Mobile phones with 4K video recording
Mobile phones with infrared transmitter
Discontinued smartphones